Iryna Volodymyrivna Herashchenko is a Ukrainian journalist and politician currently serving as a People's Deputy of Ukraine from European Solidarity. She is a Merited Journalist of Ukraine since 2000. Former First Deputy Chairwoman of the Verkhovna Rada (Ukraine's parliament), also serving as President's Humanitarian Envoy at the Minsk peace talks regarding the War in Donbas.

Early life and journalistic career 
Born on 15 May 1971 in Cherkasy, Herashchenko graduated from the Kyiv University Department of Journalism in 1993.

Herashchenko worked as a journalist for Inter and then as a presidential press secretary in 2005–06 for Viktor Yushchenko. From 2006 to 2007, she was president of Ihor Kolomoyskyi's 1+1 Media Group and UNIAN, a news service and TV channel.

Political career 
In November 2007, she entered the Verkhovna Rada for the first time as a member of the Our Ukraine–People's Self-Defense Bloc. In the 2012 Ukrainian parliamentary election, she joined the Ukrainian Democratic Alliance for Reform of Vitali Klitschko and successfully won re-election.

In June 2014, amidst the War in Donbas, Herashchenko was appointed President Petro Poroshenko's envoy for his Peace plan for Eastern Ukraine. In the 2014 Ukrainian parliamentary election, she was re-elected into the Verkhovna Rada after being in the top 10 of the electoral list of European Solidarity. There, she became Chairman of the Committee of the Verkhovna Rada on issues of European integration.

On 14 April 2016, Herashchenko was elected First Deputy Chairman of the Verkhovna Rada. As First Deputy Chairman of the Verkhovna Rada, she was among 322 Ukrainian citizens placed under sanctions by Russia in November 2018.

In the 2019 Ukrainian parliamentary election, Herashchenko was placed third on the party list of European Solidarity, and was successfully re-elected.

Personal life and earnings 
Herashchenko is married and has two daughters and a son.

According to an electronic declaration, in 2019, Herashchenko received ₴1,210,875 (US$44,847) as salary and reimbursement of expenses as deputy of the Verkhovna Rada. On her bank accounts, Iryna Herashchenko had ₴98,333. She also declared US$32,500, €6100, and ₴135,000 in cash.

Additionally, Iryna Herashchenko had a collection of paintings, as well as valuable jewellery, including Chopard and Piaget. Her husband has declared ₴4,028,356 of income (US$149,198) and 2 apartments (total area of 180 m2). Herashchenko also declared a 2013 Ford Explorer car and a 2015 LEXUS RX200T car.

References

External links 
 Profile in "Who is who in Ukraine". KIS publishing.

1971 births
Politicians from Cherkasy
Living people
University of Kyiv, Journalism Institute alumni
UNIAN
Inter (TV channel) people
Press Secretaries of the President of Ukraine
Sixth convocation members of the Verkhovna Rada
Seventh convocation members of the Verkhovna Rada
Eighth convocation members of the Verkhovna Rada
Ukrainian Democratic Alliance for Reform politicians
Petro Poroshenko Bloc politicians
Independent politicians in Ukraine
Ukrainian journalists
People of the Euromaidan
Deputy chairmen of the Verkhovna Rada
21st-century Ukrainian politicians
21st-century Ukrainian women politicians
Ninth convocation members of the Verkhovna Rada
Women members of the Verkhovna Rada